No Heart may refer to:

 No Heart (chief) (active 1830s–1850s), Iowa leader
 "No Heart" (song), a 2016 song by 21 Savage and Metro Boomin
 No Heart Creek, South Dakota
 No Heart, a Care Bears villain